The Geier Indians or Geies  were an 18th-century group of Native Americans in the United States. A small group  known as the Geiers is supposed to have been encamped "under the name Papuliquier, which is a fusion of two group names, Pacpul and Geier" in the years 1675-1707 in Frio County, Texas. The origins of the tribal label "Geier" are obscure if not apocryphal.  In this context, the word "Geier" may be a mistranscription of the Spanish word Quier (a form of Eng. want), or it may be a mistranscription or transliteration of the Spanish word Guiar (Sp. for "guide" or "lead"), rather than an accurate phonetic rendition of the tribal name from its own language.

The Franciscan Damián Massanet reported that the Geier spoke the Coahuilteco language.

Notes

Native American tribes in Texas
Native American history of Texas
Frio County, Texas